Che Yongli (born 28 January 1980) is a Chinese actress.

She is noted for her roles as A Mei and Mei Ling in the films A Singing Fairy and All For Love respectively.

Life

Early life
Che was born and raised in Chengdu, Sichuan, she graduated from Central Academy of Drama, majoring in acting.

Acting career
Che had her first experience in front of the camera in 2004, and she was chosen to act as a support actor in Hero Legend of Leifeng Temple.

In 2006, Che acted with Huang Shengyi and Zhong Xinghuo in Flying Sword, for which she won the Best Newcomer Award at the 11th Golden Phoenix Awards. At the same year, she also acted with Eric Tsang in Huizhou Hongling.

In 2007, Che had a cameo appearance in Call for Love and Crossed Lines.

In 2008, Che starred in Penicillin 1944, which propelled her to become one of the most famous actresses in China. She earned Best Actress Award at the Moscow International Film Festival, and she was nominated for the Best Actress Award at the Shanghai International Film Festival.

In 2009, Che had a minor role in The Founding of a Republic, a historical film starring Tang Guoqiang, Zhang Guoli, Chen Kun, Liu Jing, and Xu Qing. For her role as A Mei in A Singing Fairy, Che was nominated for the  Best Supporting Actress Award at the Macau International Movie Festival.

In 2010, Che won the Favorite TV Star Award at the 4th Huading Awards.

In 2013, Che participated in Switch, a Chinese-Hong Kong action film directed by Jay Sun and starring Andy Lau, Tong Dawei, Zhang Jingchu and Lin Chi-ling. That same year, Che won the Best Actress Award at the 8th Paris Chinese Film Festival for her performance in All For Love.

Works

Film

Television

Drama

Sketch

Awards

References

External links

1980 births
Actresses from Chengdu
Living people
Central Academy of Drama alumni
Chinese film actresses
Chinese television actresses
21st-century Chinese actresses